Thomas Matthew McGrath, (November 20, 1916 near Sheldon, North Dakota – September 20, 1990, Minneapolis, Minnesota) was a celebrated American poet and screenwriter of documentary films.

McGrath grew up on a farm in Ransom County, North Dakota. He earned a B.A. from the University of North Dakota at Grand Forks. He served in the Aleutian Islands with the U.S. Army Air Forces during World War II. He was awarded a Rhodes Scholarship, at Oxford. McGrath also pursued postgraduate studies at Louisiana State University in Baton Rouge. He taught at Colby College in Maine and at Los Angeles State College, from which he was dismissed in connection with his appearance, as an unfriendly witness, before the House Committee on Un-American Activities in 1953. Later he taught at North Dakota State University, and Minnesota State University, Moorhead. McGrath was married three times and had one son, Tomasito, to whom much of the poet's later work was dedicated.

McGrath wrote mainly about his own life and social concerns. His best-known work, Letter to an Imaginary Friend, was published in sections between 1957 and 1985 and as a single poem in 1997 by Copper Canyon Press.

Works
 First Manifesto, A. Swallow (Baton Rouge, LA), 1940.
 "The Dialectics of Love", Alan Swallow, editor, Three Young Poets: Thomas McGrath, William Peterson, James Franklin Lewis, Press of James A. Decker (Prairie City, IL), 1942.
 To Walk a Crooked Mile, Swallow Press (New York City), 1947.
 Longshot O'Leary's Garland of Practical Poesie, International Publishers (New York City), 1949.
 Witness to the Times!, privately printed, 1954.
 Figures from a Double World, Alan Swallow (Denver, CO), 1955.
 The gates of ivory, the gates of horn, Mainstream Publishers, 1957 (2nd edition Another Chicago Press, 1987 )
 Clouds, Melmont Publishers, 1959
 The Beautiful Things, Vanguard Press, 1960
 Letter to an Imaginary Friend, Part I, Alan Swallow, 1962
published with Part II, Swallow Press (Chicago, IL), 1970
Parts III and IV, Copper Canyon Press, 1985
compilation of all four parts with selected new material, Copper Canyon Press (Port Townsend, WA), 1997. 
 New and Selected Poems, Alan Swallow, 1964.
 The Movie at the End of the World: Collected Poems, Swallow Press, 1972.
 Poems for Little People, [Gloucester], c. 1973.
 Voyages to the Inland Sea #3: Essays and poems by R.E. Sebenthal, Thomas McGrath, Robert Dana, Center for Contemporary Poetry, 1973.
 Voices from beyond the Wall, Territorial Press (Moorhead, MN), 1974.
 A Sound of One Hand: Poems, Minnesota Writers Publishing House (St. Peter, MN), 1975.
 Open Songs: Sixty Short Poems, Uzzano (Mount Carroll, IL), 1977. 
 Letters to Tomasito, graphics by Randall W. Scholes, Holy Cow! Press (St. Paul, MN), 1977. 
 Trinc: Praises II; A Poem, Copper Canyon Press, 1979.
 Waiting for the Angel, Uzzano (Menomonie, WI), 1979. 
 Passages toward the Dark, Copper Canyon Press, 1982. 
 Echoes inside the Labyrinth, Thunder's Mouth Press, 1983. 
 Longshot O'Leary Counsels Direct Action: Poems, West End Press, 1983. 
 Selected Poems, 1938-1988, Copper Canyon Press, 1988. 
 This coffin has no handles: a novel, Thunder's Mouth Press, 1988. 
 Death Song, edited by Sam Hamill, Copper Canyon Press, 1991.

Anthologies
 Ian M. Parsons, editor, Poetry for Pleasure, Doubleday (Garden City, NY), 1960.
 Donald Hall, editor, New Poets of England and America, Meridian, 1962.
 Walter Lowenfels, editor, Poets of Today: A New American Anthology, International Publishers, 1964.
 Lucien Stryk, editor, Heartland: Poets of the Midwest, Northern Illinois University Press (DeKalb, IL), 1967.
 W. Lowenfels, editor, Where Is Vietnam?, Doubleday, 1967.
 Christmas 1968 : 14 poets, Black Rabbit Press, 1968.
 Hayden Carruth, editor, The Voice That Is Great Within Us: American Poetry of the Twentieth Century, Bantam Classics, 1970. 
 Morris Sweetkind, editor, Getting into Poetry, Rostan Holbrook Press, 1972.
 Seymour Yesner, editor, 25 Minnesota Poets , Nodin Press, 1974.
 David Kherdian, editor, Traveling America, Macmillan (New York City), 1977.
 The Norton Introduction to Literature, 2nd edition, Norton (New York City), 1977.
 
 David Ray, editor, From A to Z: 200 Contemporary Poets, Swallow Press, 1981. 
 Herman J. Berlandt, editor, Peace or perish : a crisis anthology, Poets for Peace, 1983.
 Morty Sklar, editor, Editor's Choice II : Fiction, Poetry & Art from the U.S. Small Press : Selections from Nominations Made by Editors of Independent, Noncommercial Literary Presses and Magazines, of Work Published by them from 1978 to 1983, Spirit That Moves Us Press, 1987. 
 Robert Bly, editor, The Rag and Bone Shop of the Heart : Poems for Men , HarperCollins, 1992. 
 Alan Kaufman, editor, The Outlaw Bible of American Poetry , Thunder's Mouth Press, 1999. 
 Estelle Gershgoren Novak, editor, Poets of the Non-existent City : Los Angeles in the McCarthy Era  , University of New Mexico Press, 2002. 
 Cary Nelson, editor, "The Oxford Handbook of Modern and Contemporary American Poetry", Oxford University Press, 2012.

Reviews
Best of all, Letter to an Imaginary Friend licks its fingers and burps at the table. Polite it is not--and the better for it when McGrath turns from his populist vitriol to what may be his most abiding talent: that of bestowing praise--grace, even--on the common, the unruly, the inconsolable, those McGrath chose to side and sing with and for whom "the world is too much but not enough with us.

References

Sources
The Revolutionary Poet in the United States: the Poetry of Thomas McGrath, Stern, Frederick C. (Editor), U of Missouri, Columbia, 1988 
 (reprint University of Illinois Press, 1992)

External links
"Thomas McGrath", Modern American Poetry, University of Illinois
Selected Bibliography
Documentary film of the poet, called The Movie at the End of the World
"thomas mcgrath | death song poems", Poetry Dispatch, June 24 2008
 Finding aid to Beat poets and poetry collection at Columbia University. Rare Book & Manuscript Library.
Thomas McGrath interviewed by Robb Mitchell, Northern Lights Minnesota Author Interview TV Series #55 (1988):  [https://reflections.mndigital.org/catalog/p16022coll38:17#/kaltura_video] 

1916 births
Members of the Communist Party USA
University of North Dakota alumni
American Rhodes Scholars
Louisiana State University alumni
Colby College faculty
California State University, Los Angeles faculty
Minnesota State University Moorhead faculty
North Dakota State University faculty
People from Ransom County, North Dakota
Poets from North Dakota
1990 deaths
20th-century American poets
American Book Award winners